The 2009 Nippon Professional Baseball season is the 60th season since the NPB was reorganized in

Regular season standings

Central League

Pacific League

Climax Series

Note: All of the games that are played in the first two rounds of the Climax Series are held at the higher seed's home stadium. The team with the higher regular-season standing also advances if the round ends in a tie.

Central League First Stage
Chunichi Dragons win the series, 2-1

Central League Second Stage
Yomiuri Giants have one-win advantage

Yomiuri Giants win the series, 4-1

Pacific League First Stage
Tohoku Rakuten Golden Eagles win the series, 2-0

Pacific League Second Stage
Hokkaido Nippon-Ham Fighters have one-win advantage

Hokkaido Nippon-Ham Fighters win the series, 4-1

Japan Series

See also
2009 Korea Professional Baseball season
2009 Major League Baseball season

References

External links
Official Website 
Official Website